Kleffman may refer to:

Surname
 Ervin Kleffman (1892–1987), American composer
 Fran Kleffman, American curler
 Gary Kleffman, American curler
 Terry Kleffman, American curler

Patronymic surnames